Jorma Kalevi Huuhtanen (born 26 November 1945) is a Finnish physician, civil servant and politician, born in Soini. He served as Minister of Social Affairs from 24 April 1992 to 13 April 1995. He was a member of the Parliament of Finland from 1987 to 2000, representing the Centre Party. He was the Director General of Kela from 2000 to 2010.

References

1945 births
Living people
People from Soini
Centre Party (Finland) politicians
Ministers of Social Affairs of Finland
Members of the Parliament of Finland (1987–91)
Members of the Parliament of Finland (1991–95)
Members of the Parliament of Finland (1995–99)
Members of the Parliament of Finland (1999–2003)